Gordon Hunter may refer to:

 Gordon Hunter (footballer, born 1954), English footballer (York City)
 Gordon Hunter (footballer, born 1967), Scottish footballer (Hibernian)
 Gordon Hunter (rugby union) (1949–2002), New Zealand rugby union player, coach and selector
 Gordon Hunter (rugby union, born 1958), Scottish rugby union player
 Gord Hunter (born 1946), Ottawa city councillor
 Billy Hunter (baseball) (Gordon William Hunter, born 1928), baseball player and manager

See also
Hunter (surname)